Almond is a tree in the family Rosaceae and the seed from that tree, but may also refer to:

Plants 
 Flowering almond, Prunus japonica, an ornamental shrub in family Rosaceae
 Desert almond, Prunus andersonii, a North American shrub in family Rosaceae 
 Desert range or wild almond, Prunus fasciculata, North American shrub in family Rosaceae
 Indian or Tropical almond, Terminalia catappa in family Combretaceae
 Wild or Bitter almond, Brabejum stellatifolium, in family Proteaceae
 Almond potato, a potato variety

Arts  
 The Almond Tree (fairy tale) by the Brothers Grimm
 The Almond Tree (John Ireland), a 1913 piece for solo piano by John Ireland (18791962)

Places

Antarctica
 The Almond, a rock formation

United Kingdom
 River Almond, Lothian (Scotland)
 River Almond, Perth and Kinross

United States
 Almond, Alabama, an unincorporated community in Randolph County
 Almond, New York:
 Almond (town), New York
 Almond (village), New York
 West Almond, New York 
Almond, North Carolina
 Almond, Wisconsin, a village
 Almond (town), Wisconsin, a town
 Almond Township, Minnesota
 Almond Elementary School (Los Altos, California)

People
 Almond (given name)
 Almond (surname)

Other 
 Almond (color), a color that is a creamy off-white brown
 Almond flavor
 Amaretto (disambiguation)

See also
 Almondbank, Perth and Kinross, Scotland